YouTube BrandConnect (formerly FameBit) is an interactive entertainment company founded in 2013 and headquartered in Santa Monica, California.

The company develops and maintains an Influencer Marketing link sharing platform. As of 2016 the company has been a subsidiary of Google, grouped under their YouTube division.

History

As independent company

FameBit was formed in 2013 by high school friends Agnes Kozera, and David Kierzkowski. Kierzkowski had previously co-founded the digital marketing platform TapClicks. He was approached by Kozera who was the founder of SeasonsBox, a subscription based gift delivery service, which had used social media influencers for advertising. The two developed FameBit as a link sharing platform which allowed companies to post offers to influencers.

In February 2014 FameBit was one of two Canadian based companies accepted into 500 Startups venture fund.

By 2015 FameBit had signed up about 9,000 YouTubers, and had run about 1,600 campaigns for about 1200  brands. At the time the average subscriber count for a FameBit Influencer was 46,000.

By the end of the 2015 that number had risen to 21,000 across 6 social media platforms (Vine, Twitter, Facebook, Tumblr, Instagram, & YouTube)

By 2016, FameBit had been used in the creation of about 25,000 branded videos, with and estimated 2 billion minutes of viewing time.

Acquisition by Google
On October 11, 2016, Google acquired Famebit, for what was later disclosed to be $USD 36 million. At the time of purchase, FameBit claimed 50,000 registered users. Google planned to merge the platform within their YouTube division.

Since being acquired by Google, FameBit has allowed marketers to retarget videos made on FameBit to viewers via Google's Ads.

In 2020, FameBit shut down its self-service program which allowed creators to independently find brands to work with. 

On June 16, 2020 the company rebranded as YouTube BrandConnect.

Business Model
FameBit acts as a platform for companies to post requests for social media content creators to advertise products and services, for a negotiable fee. FameBit receives 10% of this fee.

Controversy 
FameBit has been criticized by brands for allowing YouTubers to join without verifying their followers. FameBit has also been criticized by Content Creators for banning them from the platform due to brand disputes.

Several employees have claimed that FameBit promotes a toxic work environment, with 3 out of 4 of their glass door reviews awarding the company 1 star.

References

External links 
 

2013 establishments in California
YouTube
Entertainment companies established in 2013
2016 mergers and acquisitions
American companies established in 2013
Google acquisitions